Petőmihályfa is a village in Vas county, Hungary.

References

Populated places in Vas County